Strange Boutique is the debut studio album by English band The Monochrome Set. It was released in 1980, through record label Dindisc.

Track listing

Release 

The album reached number 62 on the UK Albums Chart.

Critical reception 

Writing for Smash Hits in 1980, Red Starr, in a mixed review, described Strange Boutique as "virtually impossible to pigeonhole. Starr described the lyrics as an "odd mixture of amusing fantasy and sudden seriousness". Starr finished by saying the album was "light, modern and attractive, but difficult to take too seriously".

AllMusic gave the album a mildly favourable review, writing "amid the austerity of post-punk England, and before we became awash with irony and archness, we needed a band who could raise their eyebrows and smirk at it all without ever being condescending (or maybe only a little bit condescending)."

Personnel 
The Monochrome Set
 Bid – lead vocals, guitar
 Lester Square – lead guitar, vocals
 Andy Warren – bass guitar, vocals
 J.D. Haney – drums, percussion, vocals
 Technical
 Bob Sargeant – keyboards, vocals, production
 Alvin "2 Shades" Clark – engineering
Peter Saville, The Monochrome Set - cover design

References

External links 

 

The Monochrome Set albums
1980 debut albums
Albums produced by Bob Sargeant